The Brown Palace Hotel, now The Brown Palace Hotel and Spa, Autograph Collection, is a historic hotel in Denver, Colorado, United States. It is listed on the National Register of Historic Places and is the second-longest operating hotel in Denver.  It is one of the first atrium-style hotels ever built. It is now operated by HEI Hotels and Resorts, and joined Marriott's Autograph Collection Hotels in 2012. The hotel is located at 321 17th Street between 17th Street, Broadway and Tremont Place in downtown Denver behind the Republic Plaza. The main entrance door is on Tremont Place.

History
The hotel was built in 1892 of sandstone and red granite, one year later than the Oxford Hotel. It was named for its original owner, Henry C. Brown, who had homesteaded the Capitol Hill area, and was designed with its distinctive triangular shape by architect Frank Edbrooke, who also designed the Oxford Hotel.  The interior and the exterior of the building are considered to be the "finest extant example" of Edbrooke's work.

Built with an iron and steel frame covered with cement and sandstone by the Whitehouse & Wirgler Stone Company, the building was "one of America's first fireproof structures, according to a May 21, 1892 cover story in Scientific American."  Upon its completion it was Denver's tallest building.

In the early 1930s Colorado muralist Allen Tupper True began discussing the possibility of creating two murals for the hotel with then owner Denver financier Charles Boettcher and after some delay the two works, Stage Coach and Airplane Travel were unveiled in the hotel's lobby in 1937.

In 1935, as a celebration of the Repeal of Prohibition in the United States, Denver architect Alan Fisher designed "Ship Tavern"; one of four restaurants inside The Brown Palace.

Annex
The 22-story, 231-room tower directly across Tremont Place was built as a new wing of the hotel in 1959, known as the Brown Palace West. For many years it operated as a budget wing of the hotel, until the Brown Palace's owners branded the guest rooms in the annex as a Comfort Inn in 1988, and then as a Holiday Inn Express in December 2014. The lower levels of the tower are shared with the Brown Palace, including the Grand Ballroom and executive offices. The tower is connected to the main building by a skybridge over Tremont Place and a service tunnel running under the street.

Past guests
Past guests include the "Unsinkable" Molly Brown (she stayed at the hotel only a week after the Titanic disaster), infamous Denver crime boss Jefferson "Soapy" Smith, Dr. Sun Yat Sen (just before becoming the president of the new Republic of China), Denver Socialite Louise Sneed Hill, Queen Marie of Romania, John Wayne, and The Beatles.  Presidential guests include William Taft, Warren Harding, Harry S. Truman, Dwight D. Eisenhower, Ronald Reagan, and Bill Clinton.

Murders of 1911
The hotel was the site of the high-profile 1911 murders in which Frank Henwood shot and killed Sylvester Louis "Tony" von Phul, and accidentally killed an innocent bystander, George Copeland, in the hotel's "Marble Bar."  Henwood and von Phul were rivals for (or shared) the affections of Denver socialite Isabel Springer, the wife of wealthy Denver businessman and political candidate John W. Springer. The murders culminated in a series of very public trials.

Popular culture
The hotel features in the 2017 Jane Fonda and Robert Redford film Our Souls at Night. The Brown Palace is featured on many of Denver's cultural tours.

Gallery

References

External links

Official website

Colorado State Register of Historic Properties
Hotels in Denver
Hotel buildings on the National Register of Historic Places in Colorado
National Register of Historic Places in Denver
Hotel buildings completed in 1889
Autograph Collection Hotels
Denver landmarks